Kushk-e Nar District is a district (bakhsh) in Parsian County, Hormozgan Province, Iran. At the 2006 census, its population was 19,328, in 3,911 families.  The District has two cities Dashti & Kushk-e Nar.  The District has two rural districts (dehestan): Behdasht Rural District and Kushk-e Nar Rural District.

References 

Districts of Hormozgan Province
Parsian County